is a Japanese rock band, formed in 1986, consisting of Koichi Kawanishi (drums), Tamio Okuda (vocals, rhythm guitar), Isamu Teshima (lead guitar), Kazushi Horiuchi (bass guitar), and Yoshiharu Abe (keyboard, vocals). They reunited in 2009.

Unicorn recorded the theme song for the Space Brothers anime for episodes 01-13, titled "Feel So Moon".

Members 
Current line-up
 Tamio Okuda – lead vocals, rhythm and lead guitar, occasional percussion (1986–September 1993, 2009–present)
 Isamu Teshima – lead guitar, backing and lead vocals (1986–September 1993, 2009–present)
 Kazushi "EBI" Horiuchi – bass, backing and lead vocals (1986–September 1993,2009–present)
 Yoshiharu "ABEDON" Abe – keyboard, backing and lead vocals, occasional rhythm guitar (1988–September 1993, 2009–present)
 Koichi Kawanishi – drums, percussion, backing and lead vocals (1986–February1993, 2009–present)

Timeline

Discography

Singles

Studio albums

External links 
 
Okuda Tamio'S Official Website 
ABEDON's Official Website 
EBI's Official Blog 
Teshima Isamu's Official Website 

Japanese rock music groups
Musical quintets
Ki/oon Music artists
Musical groups established in 1986
Musical groups disestablished in 1993
Musical groups reestablished in 2009
1986 establishments in Japan
Musical groups from Hiroshima Prefecture